WPBO may refer to:

 Whitefish Point Bird Observatory
 WPBO (TV), a defunct television station (channel 42 analog/43 digital) licensed to Portsmouth, Ohio, United States, formerly rebroadcasting WOSU-TV